The Dancer (in French: La Danseuse) is a 2016 French biographical historical drama film about Loie Fuller, written and directed by Stéphanie Di Giusto and co-written by Thomas Bidegain and Sarah Thiebaud, based on the novel Loïe Fuller: Danseuse de la Belle Époque by Giovanni Lista. The film stars Soko, Gaspard Ulliel, Mélanie Thierry, Lily-Rose Depp, François Damiens, Louis-Do de Lencquesaing, and Denis Ménochet.

The film made its world premiere in the Un Certain Regard section at the 2016 Cannes Film Festival. It was released theatrically in France by Wild Bunch on 28 September 2016.

Plot

Cast 
 Soko as Loie Fuller
 Gaspard Ulliel as Louis
 Mélanie Thierry as Gabrielle
 Lily-Rose Depp as Isadora Duncan
 François Damiens as Marchand
 Louis-Do de Lencquesaing as Armand
 Denis Ménochet as Ruben
 Amanda Plummer as Lili
 William Houston as Rud
 Shimehiro Nishikawa as Sada Yacco

Production 
In April 2015, it was reported that Wild Bunch had sold the international rights of the film The Dancer, about the legendary dancer Loie Fuller and her peer Isadora Duncan, starring Soko as Loie Fuller and Elle Fanning as Isadora Duncan. In September 2015, it was announced that Fanning had been replaced by Lily-Rose Depp, and that the cast also included Gaspard Ulliel, Melanie Thierry, Francois Damiens and Louis-Do de Lencquesaing. Nadia Tereszkiewicz had her first screen role as an extra in The Dancer.

The Dancer was Stéphanie Di Giusto's feature film directing debut. Di Giusto, Thomas Bidegain and Sarah Thiebaud wrote the script, with Alain Attal producing the film through Les Productions du Trésor, along with Les Films du Fleuve, Wild Bunch, and Sirena Film. The score was composed by Max Richter.

Jody Sperling served as creative consultant for the film, choreographer for Loie's dances and was also Soko's personal dance coach. Soko trained 7 hours a day for two months and did not use a body double in the film. The dance scenes were performed by herself.

Speaking of Loie Fuller's relationship with Louis d'Orsay portrayed in the film, Di Giusto said; "I ended up taking a few liberties with the truth, such as inventing the character of Louis d'Orsay, played by Gaspard Ulliel. I needed a masculine presence in the film, which is otherwise filled with women. Loïe Fuller was gay and it was important for me not to make that the subject of the film. Louis d'Orsay is a moving character: he is the film’s sacrificed man."

Filming
Principal photography on the film began on 28 September 2015, and wrapped up on 10 December 2015. Filming took place in France and the Czech Republic. Di Giusto wanted to have two shots of Soko crossing the Atlantic on a boat, but it was not possible due to the film's low budget, so in February 2016 she embarked on a ferry with Soko and the producers Marie Jardillier and Emma Javaux and shot the scenes without any permit, just with a camera and Soko.

Reception
On Rotten Tomatoes, the film has an approval rating of 59% based on reviews from 29 critics. On Metacritic it has a score of 44% based on reviews from 7 critics, indicating "mixed or average reviews".

AlloCiné, a French cinema website, gave the film an average rating of 3.4/5, based on a survey of 30 French reviews.

Following the film's screening at the Cannes Film Festival, Jay Weissberg of Variety said the film was "unnecessary" and a "formulaic biopic".

Zhuo-Ning Su of The Film Stage wrote; "The cast is solid all-around. In the lead role, Soko has both the willful masculinity and a feminine vulnerability down. Playing Louis, Ulliel is his usual charismatic self, exuding an effortless, pansexual allure that enriches a rather underwritten character infinitely. And though she only appears later in the film, Depp positively dazzles as Isadora. With her elfin litheness and an almost contemptuous self-assuredness, she owns the screen during every appearance. Ultimately, The Dancer doesn't venture from patterns of traditional biopics far enough to be called inspired, but it delivers a spirited, fully committed portrayal that allows you to observe a quintessential artist from the outside in."

Katie Walsh of Los Angeles Times wrote that The Dancer is "a bold and assured film, wildly creative and sensual, that it feels far more sophisticated than a debut, and signals Di Giusto as one to watch."

Accolades

References

External links 
 
 Press kit

2016 films
French biographical drama films
Belgian biographical drama films
Czech biographical drama films
French musical drama films
2016 biographical drama films
2010s musical drama films
French dance films
French films based on novels
Films based on French novels
French novels adapted into films
Musical films based on actual events
Drama films based on actual events
Films directed by Stéphanie Di Giusto
Films with screenplays by Thomas Bidegain
2010s dance films
2016 directorial debut films
2016 drama films
Biographical films about dancers
2010s French-language films
French-language Belgian films
English-language French films
2010s French films